SS Brighton can refer to the following ships:

 , constructed for London, Brighton and South Coast Railway, sold in 1850 to Italy
 , constructed for London, Brighton and South Coast Railway, sold in 1893
 , constructed for London, Brighton and South Coast Railway, sold to the Southern Railway in 1923, Sold again in 1930 and converted to a private yacht, wrecked 1933
 , built for R Chapman and Sons. Struck a mine and sank in 1940.
 , built for the Southern Railway. Requisitioned by the Admiralty for use as a hospital ship in World War II. Bombed and sunk in 1940
 , built for British Railways. Sold to Jersey Lines in 1967 and renamed La Duchesse de Bretagne. Scrapped in 1970.

See also
 , Sydney Harbour ferry between 1883 and 1912.
 Sports Stadium Brighton, often referred to as "SS Brighton", was the original name of the sports stadium used by the Brighton Tigers ice hockey team in England.

Ship names